Downtown Radio is a Hot Adult Contemporary music radio station based in Newtownards, County Down, that serves all of Northern Ireland using a network of AM, FM and DAB transmitters.

As of December 2022, the station has a weekly audience of 305,000 listeners according to RAJAR.

History 

The station, also known as DTR or simply Downtown, began broadcasting on 16 March 1976 - the same day as Prime Minister Harold Wilson resigned. The station had a mini-scoop, breaking the news over an hour before BBC Radio Ulster.

Downtown Radio has very much become part of the broadcasting landscape of the entire nine-county province of Ulster. Many of its presenters, such as Trevor 'Big T' Campbell and Candy Devine, are household names - Campbell and Devine have been with Downtown since it began broadcasting.

However, following the collapse of plans for a station in the Derry region (Northside Sound) in 1983, Downtown applied to the former Independent Broadcasting Authority to extend its coverage. Transmitters covering the North West, the Causeway Coast and Fermanagh/South Tyrone were opened in 1986 and 1987, and the station briefly rebranded itself as 'DTRFM' to reflect its new audience reach.

The station reverted to Downtown Radio again in 1990 following the introduction of its sister station, Cool FM, although the latter only broadcast on the 97.4 frequency in the Greater Belfast area. Other transmitters remained with Downtown.

New FM transmitters in South Down/Armagh, and Mid and East Antrim opened in the 1990s to improve reception in those areas.

The station has been very highly regarded in the past for its news output, and has been a regular stop-off point for radio journalists covering The Troubles in Northern Ireland over a 30 year period. It was the first radio station in Ireland to offer news bulletins, hourly on the hour. Changes in management made in 2007, as well as the success of the peace process, have led to Downtown reducing its news output somewhat. It is notable for being one of the few Independent Local Radio stations to still cater for minority tastes such as gospel and jazz. The country music programmes broadcast several times a week are among Downtown's highest listenership ratings.  In December 2012, Downtown opened a small studio in Derry ahead of the city’s year of being UK City of Culture, situated in the Food Quarter within Foyleside Shopping Centre. It remains open and in use, mainly at the weekend with presenter-led programming on Saturday afternoon and Sunday covering a range of events in the region.

Schedules 

As of December 2021, the schedule for Downtown Radio is as follows:

Mondays to Fridays
Friday At 19.00 is Paul Orr 
and at 22.00 is Paul Kennedy 

 6.00am - Downtown Breakfast with Gary Myles and Glen Pavis:
 10.00am - Caroline Fleck: 
 1.00pm - Owen Larkin in the afternoon.
 4.00pm - Downtown Drive With Neal McClelland 
 7.00pm - Evenings With Kirstie McMurray On Downtown Radio 
 10.00pm - Late Lounge with David Gordon 
 1.00am - All Night Downtown: Playing the best music through the night on Downtown

Saturdays

 6.00am - Weekend Breakfast With Kirstie McMurray and David Coleman 
 10.00am - Paul Orr 
 1.00pm - Paul Francis 
 4.00pm - Lisa McHugh 
 7.00pm - Downtown Anthems With Neal 
 10.00pm - Kevin McAlister 
 1.00am - All Night Downtown: Playing the best music through the night on Downtown

Sundays

 6.00am - Weekend Breakfast with Kirstie McMurray and David Coleman 

 10.00am - Paul Orr
 1.00pm - Paul Francis 
 4.00pm -  NI Hit 40 With DJ Hix

 7.00pm - Sunday Evening with Hannah Kirkpatrick 
 10.00pm - Kevin McAllister 

 1.00am - All Night Downtown: Playing the best music through the night on Downtown

Frequencies 
1026 kHz: Antrim, Armagh, Ballyclare, Ballymena, Banbridge, Bangor, Belfast, Carrickfergus, Comber, Cookstown, Downpatrick, Dungannon, Lisburn, Lurgan, Maghera, Magherafelt, Newcastle, Newtownards, Portadown, Portaferry
96.4 MHz: Ballycastle, Ballymoney, Coleraine, Dungiven, Limavady, Portrush, Portstewart
96.6 MHz: Dungannon, Enniskillen, Omagh
97.1 MHz: Larne (East Antrim)
102.3 MHz: Antrim, Ballymena, Clough Mills, Magherafelt, Randalstown, Rasharkin, Templepatrick
102.4 MHz: Derry, Strabane
103.1 MHz: Armagh, Newry
103.4 MHz: Newcastle (Mourne)
103.4 MHz: (from Carnmoney Hill): Belfast, Newtownabbey, Holywood, Carrickfergus

Notable past presenters

Past presenters include Eamonn Holmes and Frank Mitchell.

References

External links
 

Bauer City network
Bauer Radio
Radio stations in Northern Ireland
Mass media in County Down
Newtownards
Radio stations established in 1976
1976 establishments in Northern Ireland